Sharon Fichman and Sun Shengnan won the title, defeating Viktoryia Kisialeva and Nathalia Rossi 6–4, 6–2 in the final.

Seeds

  Sharon Fichman /  Sun Shengnan (champions)
  Amanda Fink /  Elizabeth Lumpkin (semifinals)
  Julia Glushko /  Tammi Patterson (first round)
  Remi Tezuka /  Zhang Ling (first round)

Draw

Draw

References
 Main Draw

Challenger Banque Nationale de Granby
Challenger de Granby